Tiger Number One (earlier titled Nababzada) is a Bengali action film directed by Shaheen Sumon. It stars Shakib Khan, Nipun, Shahara, Amit Hasan, Misha Sawdagor, Shiba Shanu, Kazi Hayat, Abul Hayat, and Don, among others. This is the first film in which Shakib Khan has played a villain role. Tiger Number One was released on Eid al-Fitr, 31 August 2011.

Plot
The film is focused on an innocent young man who later becomes a dangerous killer in the city.

Cast
 Shakib Khan as Tiger / Shanto
 Nipun Akter as Sweety
 Shahara  as Shopna
 Amit Hasan as Akram
 Misha Sawdagor
 Shiba Shanu
 Kazi Hayat
 Abul Hayat
 Don
 Rahina Joli
 Dolly Johur
 Anna
 Bobi 
 Kabila

Themes
According to Orchi Othondrila, mainstream Bangladeshi films are "always based on a central hero while female characters are there as objects to complement [the] hero's actions." She wrote that, as with many other Shakib Khan film titles, the title Tiger Number One implies "that the stories are solely depended on the hero who is the centre of the actions."

Music
The music for Tiger Number One was directed by Imon Shah.

References

2011 films
2011 action films
Bengali-language Bangladeshi films
Bangladeshi action films
Films scored by Emon Saha
2010s Bengali-language films